As a three letter acronym, IHO can be:
International Hydrographic Organization
the former IOC 3-letter country code for Netherlands Indies